This is a list of settlements in the county of Hampshire, England. Places highlighted in bold type are towns or cities.

The Isle of Wight was in Hampshire until 1890. Bournemouth and adjacent parishes in the far west were transferred to the ceremonial and administrative county of Dorset in 1974.

A
Abbots Worthy -
Abbotstone -
Abbotts Ann -
Abbotts Ann Down -
Abbotts Barton -
Adbury -
Adhurst St Mary -
Alderholt -
Aldern Bridge -
Aldershot -
Allum Green - 
Alton -
Alverstoke -
Ampfield -
Amport -
Andover -
Andover Down -
Andwell -
Anna Valley -
Appleshaw -
Ashe -
Ashe Warren -
Ashford Hill -
Ashfield  -
Ashlett - 
Ashley (East Hampshire) -
Ashley (New Forest) -
Ashley (Test Valley) -
Ashley Range - 
Ashley Warren -
Ashmansworth -
Ashurst -
Avington -
Awbridge - 
Axford -
Axmansford

B
Badger Farm -
Baffins - 
Bagnum -
Bank -
Bartley -
Barton on Sea -
Barton Stacey -
Basingstoke -
Bassett -
Bassett Green -
Baughurst -
Beaulieu -
Beauworth -
Bedhampton -
Beech -
Beggarwood -
Bentley -
Bentworth -
Betty Mundy's Bottom -
Bickton -
Bighton -
Binley - 
Binsted -
Bishop's Green -
Bishops Sutton -
Bishopstoke - 
Bishop's Waltham -
Bisterne -
Bitterne -
Bitterne Park -
Bitterne Manor -
Blackfield -
Blackmoor -
Blacknest -
Blackwater -
Blashford -
Blendworth -
Blissford -
Boarhunt -
Bolderwood -
Boldre -
Bordean -
Bordon -
Botley -
Bradley -
Braishfield -
Brambridge -
Bramdean -
Bramley -
Bramley Corner -
Bramley Green-
Bramshaw -
Bramshill -
Bramshott -
Bransbury -
Breamore -
Brockenhurst -
Brook -
Brookheath -
Broughton -
Brown Candover -
Broxhill -
Buckland (New Forest) -
Buckland (Portsmouth) -
Bucklers Hard -
Bull Hill -
Burgate -
Burghclere -
Buriton -
Burkham -
Burley -
Burridge - 
Bursledon -
Butlocks Heath -
Butser Hill

C
Cadnam -
Calmore -
Calshot -
Canada -
Catherington -
Catisfield - 
Chalton -
Chandler's Ford -
Charter Alley -
Chartwell Green -
Chattis Hill -
Chawton -
Cheriton -
Chilbolton -
Chilbolton Down -
Chilcomb -
Chilton Candover -
Chilworth -
Chineham -
Chithurst -
Church Crookham -
Clanfield -
Clanville -
Cliddesden -
Colden Common -
Cole Henley -
Colemore -
Compton - 
Conford -
Copnor -
Copythorne -
Corhampton -
Cosham -
Cottonworth -
Cove -
Cowplain -
Crampmoor -
Crawley -
Crockerhill -
Crondall -
Crookham Village -
Crow -
Crux Easton - Curbridge - 
Curdridge

D
Damerham -
Deane -
Denmead -
Dibden -
Dibden Purlieu -
Ditcham -
Dogmersfield -
Downton -
Drayton -
Droxford - 
Dummer -
Dunbridge -
Dunley -
Durford Wood -
Durley

E
East Anton -
East Boldre -
East Cholderton -
East End -
East Hill -
East Martin -
East Meon -
East Mills -
East Stratton -
East Tisted -
East Wellow -
East Woodhay -
East Worldham -
Eastleigh -
Eastney -
Easton -
Eling -
Ellingham -
Ellisfield -
Elvetham Heath -
Embley -
Emery Down -
Empshott -
Emsworth -
Enham Alamein -
Eversley -
Eversley Centre -
Eversley Cross -
Everton -
Ewshot -
Exbury -
Exbury Gardens - 
Exton

F
Faccombe -
Fair Oak -
Fareham -
Fareham Common -
Farleigh Wallop -
Farlington -
Farnborough -
Farringdon -
Fawley -
Finchdean -
Finkley -
Finkley Down -
Firgo -
Fishers Pond -
Fleet -
Flexcombe -
Fobdown -
Fordingbridge -
Forest Corner -
Forton -
Four Marks -
Fox Amport -
Foxcotte -
Fratton -
Freefolk -
Fritham -
Frogham -
Froxfield -
Froyle -
Fullerton -
Funtley - 
Furze Hill -
Fyfield

G
Godshill -
Godshill Green -
Godshill Wood -
Goodworth Clatford -
Gore End - 
Gorley Lynch -
Gosport -
Grateley -
Grayshott -
Great Shoddesden -
Greatham -
Greywell -
Griggs Green -
Gundleton

H
Hale -
Hale Park -
Hale Purlieu -
Hamble-le-Rice -
Hambledon -
Hangersley -
Hannington -
Harbridge -
Hardley -
Hardway -
Harestock -
Hare Warren -
Hartfordbridge -
Hartley Mauditt -
Hartley Wespall -
Hartley Wintney -
Hatch Warren -
Hatherden -
Havant -
Hawkley -
Hawley -
Hayling Island -
Hazeley -
Headbourne Worthy -
Headley -
Headley Down -
Heath End -
Heath House -
Heckfield -
Heckfield Heath -
Hedge End -
Herriard -
Highbridge -
Highclere -
Highfield -
Hightown -
Highwood -
Hill Brow -
Hill Head -
Hillyfields - 
Hilsea -
Hinton - 
Hinton Admiral -
Hinton Ampner -
Hinton Daubney -
Holbury -
Hollywater -
Holybourne -
Hook, Basingstoke -
Hook, Warsash -
Hook Common -
Hordle -
Horndean -
Horsebridge -
Horton Heath -
Houghton - 
Houghton Down -
Hound -
Hound Green - 
Horndean -
Hungerford -
Hursley -
Hurstbourne Priors -
Hurstbourne Tarrant -
Hyde -
Hythe -

I
Ibsley -
Ibthorpe -
Ibworth -
Idsworth -
Inhurst -
Isington -
Itchen Abbas -
Itchen Stoke

K
Kempshott -
Keyhaven -
Kilmeston -
Kimbridge -
Kimpton -
Kimpton Down - 
King's Somborne -
Kings Worthy -
Kingsclere -
Kingston (Portsmouth) -
Kingston (Ringwood) -
Knights Enham -
Knightwood -
Knowle

L
Langley -
Langrish -
Langstone -
Lasham -
Laverstoke -
Leckford -
Lee -
Lee-on-the-Solent -
Leigh Park -
Lepe -
Linbrook -
Lindford -
Linford -
Linkenholt -
Linwood -
Liphook -
Liss -
Litchfield -
Little Ann -
Little Down -
Little Hatherden -
Little London (Andover) -
Little London (Tadley) -
Little Park -
Little Posbrook - 
Little Shoddesden -
Little Somborne -
Littleton -
Lockerley -
Locks Heath -
Long Common -
Long Sutton -
Longmoor -
Longparish -
Longstock -
Longstock Park -
Lopshill -
Lovedean -
Lower Chute -
Lower Daggons -
Lower Farringdon -
Lower Froyle -
Lower Swanwick - 
Lower Upham -
Lower Wield -
Lower Woodcott -
Lower Wyke - 
Lychpit -
Lymington -
Lyndhurst

M
Malshanger -
Mapledurwell -
Marchwood -
Marsh Court -
Martin -
Martyr Worthy - 
Mattingley -
Medstead -
Meon - 
Meonstoke -
Micheldever -
Michelmersh -
Middle Wallop -
Middle Wyke -
Milford on Sea -
Milton -
Minstead -
Mislingford -
Mockbeggar -
Monk Sherborne -
Monkwood -
Monxton -
Morestead -
Mortimer West End -
Mottisfont -
Moundsmere

N
Nately Scures -
Neatham -
Nether Wallop -
Netherton -
Netley -
Netley Abbey -
New Alresford -
Newbridge -
New Forest -
New Milton -
Newfound -
Newnham -
Newton Stacey -
Newton Valence -
Newtown - 
Newtown Common - 
Norley Wood -
North Baddesley -
North Boarhunt -
North Camp -
North End -
North Gorley - 
North Houghton -
North Oakley -
North Stoneham -
North Sydmonton - 
North Waltham -
North Warnborough -
Northington -
Northington Down -
Nursling -
Nursted -
Nutley -

O
Oakhanger -
Oakley -
Odiham -
Ogdens -
Old Alresford -
Old Basing -
Olivers Battery -
Ossemsley -
Otterbourne -
Over Wallop -
Overton -
Ovington -
Ower -
Owslebury -
Owslebury Bottom

P
Palestine -
Pamber End -
Pamber Green -
Pamber Heath -
Paulsgrove -
Park Gate -
Passfield -
Pennington -
Penton Corner -
Penton Grafton -
Penton Mewsey -
Penwood - 
Petersfield -
Phoenix Green -
Picket Hill -
Picket Piece -
Picket Post -
Picket Twenty -
Pill Heath -
Pilley -
Pitt -
Plaitford -
Plastow Green -
Popham - 
Port Solent -
Portchester -
Portmore -
Portsea and Portsea Island - 
Portsmouth -
Poulner -
Preston Candover -
Priors Dean -
Privett -
Purbrook -
Purbrook Heath

Q
Quarley

R
Ragged Appleshaw -
Rake -
Ramridge Park -
Ramsdean -
Ramsdell -
Red Post Bridge -
Red Rice -
Redenham -
Redenham Park -
Ringwood -
Rockbourne -
Rockford -
Romsey -
Ropley -
Rotherwick -
Rowland's Castle -
Rownhams

S
Sandford -
Sandleheath -
Sarisbury -
Sarisbury Green -
Segensworth West -
Selborne -
Shalden -
Shawford - 
Shedfield -
Sheet -
Selborne - 
Shedfield -
Sherborne St John -
Sherfield English -
Sherfield on Loddon -
Shipton Bellinger -
Shirrell Heath -
Shobley -
Shootash -
Silchester -
Sleaford -
Smannell -
Snoddington -
Soberton -
Somerley -
South Baddesley -
South Boarhunt -
South Gorley -
South Harewood -
South Litchfield -
South Tidworth (until 1991)3 -
South Warnborough -
South Wonston -
Southampton -
Southsea -
Southwick -
Southwood -
Sparsholt -
St Cross -
St Mary Bourne -
Standford -
Stansted -
Stansted Park -
Steep -
Steep Marsh -
Steventon -
Stockbridge -
Stoke (Basingstoke and Deane) -
Stoke (Havant) -
Stoke Charity -
Stokes Bay -
Somerstown -
Southsea -
Stamshaw -
Steep -
Stoney Cross -
Stratfield Turgis -
Stroud -
Stubbington -
Stuckton - 
Stratfield Saye -
Stratfield Turgis -
Sutton Scotney - 
Swanmore -
Swanwick -
Swarraton -
Sway

T
Tadley -
Tangley -
Temple Valley -
Thedden -
Thruxton -
Thruxton Down -
Tichborne -
Tickley - 
Timsbury -
Tinkers Cross -
Tipner -
Tiptoe -
Titchfield -
Totton and Eling -
Tufton -
Tufton Warren -
Tunworth -
Turgis Green -
Turmer -
Twyford -
Twyford Moors

U
Up Nately -
Up Somborne -
Upham -
Upper Chute -
Upper Clatford -
Upper Enham -
Upper Farringdon -
Upper Froyle -
Upper Wield -
Upper Woodcott -
Upper Wootton -
Upton, Hurstbourne Tarrant (near Andover) -
Upton, Nursling (near Southampton) -
Upton Grey

V
Vernhams Dean -
Vernham Street

W
Wadwick -
Waggoners Wells -
Walhampton -
Waltham Chase -
Warblington -
Warnford -
Warsash -
Waterlooville -
Well -
Wellow - 
Wells-in-the-Field -
West End -
West Heath -
West Meon -
West Stratton -
West Tisted - 
West Wellow -
West Worldham -
Weston (Petersfield) -
Weston (Southampton) -
Weston Colley -
Weston Corbett -
Weston Patrick -
Weyhill -
Wherwell -
Wherwell Wood -
Whitchurch -
Whitehill -
Whiteley - 
Whitnal -
Whitsbury -
Whitsbury Common -
Whitsbury Cross -
Whitway - 
Wickham -
Wickham Common -
Widley -
Wildhern -
Winchester -
Winchfield -
Winklebury -
Winnall -
Winslade -
Winsor -
Wintershill - 
Wivelrod -
Wolverton -
Wolverton Common -
Wonston -
Wood End -
Woodgreen -
Woodlands -
Woodmancott -
Woolmer - 
Woolston -
Woolton Hill -
Wootton St Lawrence -
Worlds End -
Worthy Down -
Worting -
Wyck -
Wymering

Y
Yateley

See also
 Places of interest in Hampshire
List of settlements in Hampshire by population
List of places in England

Notes

 
Hampshire
Places